Redonda chiquinquirana is a butterfly species from the subfamily Satyrinae in the family Nymphalidae. It is endemic from the Cordillera de Merida páramo in Venezuela, in northern South America. R. chiquinquirana show high degree of sexual dimorphism in wingsize, in which females show some degree of wing deformation which might point to incipient brachyptery.

Taxonomy and nomenclature 

Populations of this species were often referred to as an undescribed subspecies of Redonda empetrus.

Conservation 

Redonda chiquinquirana is listed as endangered in Venezuela's Red Book of Fauna.

References

External links 

Satyrini
Páramo fauna
Butterflies described in 2015